Abu Rumaysah al-Britani (born 24 June 1983), born Siddhartha Dhar, is a British citizen who is an Islamic State of Iraq and the Levant (ISIL) militant. In January 2016, he was named as the narrator in a film issued by ISIL that showed the execution of suspected spies against the regime. Abu Rumaysah has been designated as a global terrorist by the United States.

Dhar was born in London to a Bengali-speaking Hindu family of Indian origin and changed his name to Abu Rumaysah after his conversion to Islam. He is believed to be in his late 30s as of 2022. He acted as a spokesperson for the Islamist group Al-Muhajiroun, an organisation banned in the UK, and worked as an aide to Al-Muhajiroun's co-founder, Anjem Choudary. Dhar also owned a bouncy castle rental company. He lived in Walthamstow. He used social media to promote his  Islamist views and attended demonstrations in Britain against the United States, Israel, and Arab regimes. In a video he posted to YouTube, Dhar described ISIL's self declared caliphate as "...a dream for all Muslims worldwide ... We can finally have a sanctuary where we can practice our religion and live under the sharia. It is a big, big thing".

He spoke of his desire for the United Kingdom to be governed under sharia law on the BBC's Sunday Morning Live programme, and said of himself that he didn't "...really identify myself with British values. I am Muslim first, second and last". In 2014, Dhar was under investigation by British authorities for allegedly encouraging terrorism, but subsequently disappeared after being released on bail. Although he had been banned from travelling, Dhar departed for Paris from Victoria Coach Station in London with his wife, Aisha, and their four children, and later arrived in Syria.

Dhar wrote a travel guide to the Islamic State in May 2015, called A Brief Guide to Islamic State, and wrote of it that "If you thought London or New York was  cosmopolitan, then wait until you step foot  in the Islamic State because it screams diversity. ... In my short time here I have met people from absolutely every walk of life, proof that the caliphate's pulling power is strong and tenacious".

He appeared in the Channel 4 documentary The Jihadis Next Door.

References

1983 births
Living people
People from Walthamstow
People from Edmonton, London
English Islamists
British emigrants to Syria
English travel writers
Islamic State of Iraq and the Levant members
Islamic terrorism in the United Kingdom
Killing of captives by the Islamic State of Iraq and the Levant
English people of Bengali descent
Islamic State of Iraq and the Levant and the United Kingdom
English people of Indian descent